This article relates to the flora of New Zealand, especially indigenous strains. New Zealand's geographical isolation has meant the country has developed a unique variety of native flora.  However, human migration has led to the importation of many other plants (generally referred to as 'exotics' in New Zealand) as well as widespread damage to the indigenous flora, especially after the advent of European colonisation, due to the combined efforts of farmers and specialised societies dedicated to importing European plants & animals.

Characteristics 
Indigenous New Zealand flora generally has the following characteristics:
 the majority are evergreen.
 few annual herbs.
 few cold-tolerant trees.
 majority are dispersed by birds.
 very few have defences against mammalian browsers.
 few nitrogen fixing plants.
 few fire-adapted species.
 many dioecious species.
 flowers are typically small and white.
 many plants have divaricating growth forms.
 many plants have evolved into larger forms compared with similar plant families in other countries.

List of plants

Trees and shrubs

 Akeake
 Bartlett's rātā or Cape Reinga white rātā
 Beech (Nothofagus)
 Bog pine
 Broom
 Cabbage tree or Tī rākau / Tī kōuka
 Coprosma
 Daisy bush
 Dracophyllum
 Five finger
 Fuchsia or Kōtukutuku
 Hebes
 Horopito
 Kahikatea or White Pine
 Kaka Beak
 Kanuka
 Kapuka or Broadleaf
 Karaka
 Karamū
 Karo
 Kauri
 Kawakawa
 Kohekohe
 Kohuhu
 Kōwhai
 Kumaraho
 Lacebark
 Lancewood or Horoeka
 Lemonwood or Tarata
 Mahoe or Whiteywood
 Maire
 Manawa or White or Grey mangrove
 Mānuka or Tea Tree
 Māpou or Red Matipo
 Matagouri
 Mataī or Black Pine
 Mingimingi
 Miro
 Manoao or Silver pine
 Mountain tōtara
 Neinei
 Ngaio
 Nikau
 Northern rātā
 Olearia
 Ongaonga or Tree nettle
 Patē or Seven Finger
 Other Pittosporums
 Pōhutukawa
 Poroporo or Bullibulli
 Puka
 Putaputaweta or marbleleaf
 Rangiora or Bushman's friend
 Rewarewa or New Zealand honeysuckle
 Ribbonwood or Manatu
 Rimu or Red Pine
 Southern rātā
 Tanekaha
 Taraire
 Tawa
 Titoki
 Toatoa
 Toru
 Tōtara
 Tetrapathaea tetrandra
 Tutu
 Yellow pine
 Whau
 Wineberry or Makomako

Ferns
While most of the world's ferns grow in tropical climates, New Zealand hosts an unusual number of ferns for a temperate country. These exhibit a variety of forms, from stereotypical feather-shaped tufted ferns and tree ferns to less typical filmy, leafy and climbing ferns. Both the koru, in the shape of an unfurling fern frond, and the silver fern are widely accepted symbols of New Zealand.

New Zealand has ten species of tree ferns, but there are numerous ground, climbing and perching smaller ferns to be found throughout the countries forests, the largest of which is the king fern.

 Silver fern or ponga, Cyathea dealbata
 New Zealand tree fern, Dicksonia squarrosa
 Black tree fern or mamaku, Cyathea medullaris
 Tuokura, Dicksonia lanata
 Kuripaka, Dicksonia fibrosa
 Mountain tree fern, Cyathea colensoi
 Gully tree fern, Cyathea cunninghamii
 Soft tree fern, Cyathea smithii
 King fern, Ptisana salicina
 Prince of Wales fern, Leptopteris superba
 Hound's tongue fern, Microsorum pustulatum
 Kidney fern or raurenga, Trichomanes reniforme
 Hen and chickens fern, Asplenium bulbiferum
 Hanging spleenwort, Asplenium flaccidum
 Mangemange, Lygodium articulatum

Seaweeds
 Neptune's necklace

Liverworts
New Zealand has a greater density of liverworts than any other country, due to its cool, wet and temperate climate. About half the species are endemic to New Zealand.

There are 606 species known in New Zealand. While these include some thallose liverworts, with liver-shaped thalli, most are leafy liverworts which can be confused with mosses and filmy ferns. Undescribed species, and those not previously recorded in New Zealand, continue to be found in lowland forests. Ninety species and varieties are listed on the 2001 Department of Conservation threatened plants list, and 157 liverwort species and varieties will be included on the next version of the list as a result of better knowledge of the group.

A three-volume work on liverworts in New Zealand is being written by John Engel and David Glenny, with the first volume published in 2008. The first volume will also be placed online in June 2009 as part of Floraseries.

Grasses
There are 187 species of native grasses in New Zealand: 157 endemic and 30 indigenous species.

The grasses belong to the following tribes and genera:

 Ehrharteae
 Microlaena, 4 species
 Zotovia, 3 species
 Stipeae
 Achnatherum, 1 species
 Anemanthele, 1 species
 Austrostipa, 1 species
 Poeae
 Austrofestuca, 1 species
 Festuca, 10 species
 Poa, 38 species
 Puccinellia, 4 species
 Agrostideae
 Agrostis, 10 species
 Amphibromus, 1 species
 Deschampsia, 5 species
 Deyeuxia, 5 species
 Dichelachne, 4 species
 Echinopogon, 1 species
 Hierochloe, 7 species
 Koeleria, 3 species
 Lachnagrostis, 12 species
 Trisetum, 9 species
 Simplicia, 2 species

 Hordeeae
 Australopyrum, 1 species
 Elymus, 7 species
 Stenostachys, 3 species
 Danthonieae 
 Chionochloa, 22 species
 Cortaderia (Toetoe), 5 species
 Pyrrhanthera, 1 species
 Rytidosperma, 18 species
 Chlorideae
 Zoysia, 2 species
 Leptureae
 Lepturus, 1 species
 Paniceae
 Cenchrus, 1 species
 Oplismenus, 1 species
 Spinifex, 1 species
 Isachneae
 Isachne, 1 species
 Andropogoneae
 Imperata, 1 species

Mosses
There are 523 known moss species and 23 varieties in New Zealand, with 208 genera represented. 108 species and 11 genera are considered endemic. Most New Zealand mosses originated in Gondwana, so there are strong relationships with species in Tasmania, South-eastern Australia, and temperate parts of South America. The endemic genera are:

 Beeveria
 Bryobeckettia
 Bryodixonia
 Cladomnion

 Crosbya
 Cryptopodium
 Dichelodontium
 Fifea

 Hypnobartlettia
 Mesotus
 Tetracoscinodon

Sphagnum moss is also of economic importance.

Other

 Bush lawyer
 Celmisia (Mountain Daisy)
 Megaherbs
 Nine species of mistletoe, including Peraxilla colensoi, Peraxilla tetrapetala, Alepis flavida, and the extinct Trilepidea adamsii (last seen in 1954).
 Mount Cook Lily
 New Zealand flax
 New Zealand spinach (Kokihi)
 Nikau Palm
 Pingao
 Raupō or bulrush
 Supplejack
 Tecomanthe speciosa
 Wood rose

See also
 Environment of New Zealand 
Biodiversity of New Zealand
 List of trees native to New Zealand
 Hebe Society

References

External links

 http://www.nzflora.info/index.html - Flora of New Zealand
 
 Royal New Zealand Institute of Horticulture. Lincoln University, Canterbury, New Zealand.
 New Zealand Plant Names Database
 Bushmansfriend:NZ native plant information
 New Zealand Plant Conservation Network
 http://www.landcareresearch.co.nz/resources/identification/plants/grass-key  (a Lucid key to naturalised and indigenous grasses of New Zealand)
 Native New Zealand Plants, University of Auckland